The Delaware Field House is an indoor athletics facility on the campus of the University of Delaware in Newark, Delaware. Constructed in 1966, the venue seated 4,000 fans for indoor track and tennis events. It served as the site of intercollegiate basketball games as well until the completion of the Bob Carpenter Center in mid-1992.

The Field House is part of a complex which includes the new arena, Delaware Stadium (football), Rullo Stadium (field hockey/lacrosse), Bob Hannah Stadium (baseball), an outdoor swimming pool, and six tennis courts.

The arena served as the site of the America East Conference (then North Atlantic Conference) men's basketball tournament championship game in 1992.

In 2010, the University installed solar panels on the half barrel roof of the Field House.  In 2013, the Field House was converted into an indoor practice facility with artificial turf for all sports including football.

References

American football venues in Delaware
Athletics (track and field) venues in Delaware
Basketball venues in Delaware
College football venues
College tennis venues in the United States
College indoor track and field venues in the United States
Defunct college basketball venues in the United States
Delaware Fightin' Blue Hens men's tennis venues
Delaware Fightin' Blue Hens women's tennis venues
Tennis venues in Delaware
Sports venues completed in 1966
1966 establishments in Delaware